30 is the fourth studio album by English singer-songwriter Adele. It was released on 19 November 2021 by Columbia Records, as Adele's first studio album since 25 (2015). 30 is inspired by Adele's divorce, motherhood, fame, and heartache, and expresses themes of acceptance and hope. She wrote the album from 2018 through 2020 with producers such as Greg Kurstin, Max Martin and Shellback, all of whom worked on 25 as well. New collaborators included Ludwig Göransson, and Inflo of English band Sault.

Musically, 30 is a pop, soul, and jazz album. Journalists have described it as Adele's most creative work sonically, expanding on her past works by incorporating dance-pop, gospel and jazz elements. American jazz pianist Erroll Garner appears on the track "All Night Parking" as a guest act, marking the first time an artist is featured on a standard album by Adele.  The lead single, "Easy on Me", was released on 15 October 2021 and topped the charts in 27 territories. An extensive marketing campaign was used to promote 30, including Adele One Night Only in the US and An Audience with Adele in the UK.

30 reached number one in 34 countries, including the UK where it became Adele's fourth consecutive number-one album, making her the first act to debut all their albums atop the UK Albums Chart; it garnered the highest first-week sales for an album by a female artist in the UK since Adele's own 25 and became 2021's best-seller in the country. In the US, it was Adele's third consecutive Billboard 200 number-one album and also became the best-selling album of 2021. 30 was the world's best-selling album of 2021, selling 4.68 million copies.

30 was met with widespread critical acclaim for its cinematic instrumentation, vocal performances, and introspective lyrics. It appeared on the 2021 year-end best-albums lists from various publications, many of which considered it Adele's best record. The album was nominated for six Grammy Awards at the 65th Annual Grammy Awards (2023), including Album of the Year, Record of the Year and Song of the Year, while "Easy on Me" won Best Pop Solo Performance, making Adele the most awarded artist in the category with 4 wins. 30 won British Album of the Year at the Brit Awards 2022, making Adele the first solo artist in history to win the honour three times.

Background
During the conception of 25, Adele wrote enough material for what she claimed could be three or four albums. She later revealed that she had four or five songs that she might revisit at a later date, among them a Greg Kurstin-contributed song that she felt was more appropriate once she was older. Multiple collaborations with songwriter Diane Warren were also cut from 25, though Warren mentioned the possibility of some of the songs appearing on future albums. In 2018, mainstream media outlets reported that Adele was working on her fourth studio album. Drummer Matt Chamberlin confirmed that he had been in the studio with her for her fourth studio album. Along with Rick Nowels, John Legend and Raphael Saadiq in hopes of crafting an album "full of soul, with a more eclectic sound."

Following Adele's marriage to Simon Konecki in 2018, 2 years later than media outlets reported, Adele filed for divorce in 2019. Following the separation from Konecki, and on a journey of self-healing, she began therapy sessions and mended the estranged relationship with her father. Through this period Adele would suffer from anxiety, which inspired 30, along with her separation from Konecki, the scrutiny of fame and her motherhood. The years that followed leaving her marriage plagued Adele, especially the effect it had on her son. Adele decided to have regular conversations with her son about the divorce and recorded her conversations following advice from her therapist. Around the same time, Adele returned to the studio inspired by her conversations with her son and wanting to create a body of work that would explain to him why she left his father.

Early on in the promotion for 25, Adele revealed that she planned to stop naming albums after her age. However, on her 31st birthday, Adele published a rare social media post in which she – seemingly jokingly – referred to her next album as 30, alluding to the theme of her previous three albums' titles. On 15 February 2020, Adele announced at a friend's wedding that her fourth studio album would be out by September 2020. However, she would later confirm that the album's production and release had been delayed due to the COVID-19 pandemic.

Writing and recording

Using music as an outlet post-divorce, Adele went to the studio describing it as "basically running away". Similarly to Adele's previous albums, the vocal tracks used on 30 are original demos.
Adele wanted to create a "safe space" during the album's recording and opted to work with fewer people than on her previous project 25. 
Choosing producers Adele felt comfortable with influenced her choice in collaborators. Adele reunited with long-time collaborator, record producer and friend Greg Kurstin, which allowed Adele to feel as though she "could say anything, sing anything, and they wouldn't judge me." Together Adele and Kurstin worked on six songs; "Easy on Me", "My Little Love", "Cry Your Heart Out", "Oh My God", "I Drink Wine" and "All Night Parking".

Originally a 15-minute song, inspired by Elton John and Bernie Taupin, "I Drink Wine" was written by Adele to express her remorse for not being present for a close friend and was later cut back following label feedback. "All Night Parking" posthumously credits American jazz pianist Erroll Garner as a featured artist, making it the first song on a standard Adele album to have a featured artist credit. Adele worked with previous collaborators and Swedish producers and songwriters Max Martin and Shellback, and Canadian singer-songwriter Tobias Jesso Jr. "Oh My God", produced by Kurstin, was written during a period of time when Adele's anxiety was subsiding. Referencing dating post-divorce, Adele wrote the song inspired by her first time flirting after her split with Simon Konecki.

Adele also worked with producers for the first time, including Swedish composer Ludwig Göransson, and British producer Inflo (of the music collective Sault). Heavily inspired by the Judy Garland biopic, Adele was attracted to the new sounds, chords and cadences Göransson introduced to her which led to the song "Strangers by Nature". Adele immediately gravitated towards Inflo, due to their similar age and both being raised in North London. The pair's recording sessions would often start with extensive conversations, before pin-pointing an emotion they wanted to write about. Together they wrote and produced three songs, "Woman like Me", "Hold On" and "Love Is a Game". The latter was inspired by Breakfast at Tiffany's, which was played on mute during the recording sessions. "Hold On" was written by Adele regarding the numerous times she lost hope during her divorce and features backing vocals from her friends. Recalling writing the track Adele said; "I remember I didn't belly laugh for about a year. But I didn't realize I was making progress until I wrote 'Hold On' and listened to it back. Later, I was like, 'Oh, fuck, I've really learned a lot. I've really come a long way.'" By February 2020, 30 was mostly completed, except for some orchestral elements and backing vocals.

Composition
Stereogum described 30 as a pop, soul, and jazz record. It also contains elements of R&B, gospel, and dance-pop. The album incorporates choir vocals, harmonies, voice notes, elegant violins, mellow strings, organs, and horns. Thematically, the album addresses Adele's divorce, anxiety, and motherhood. During an Instagram Live on 9 October 2021, Adele reiterated that 30 would centre on her divorce. Adele noted that 30 is more introspective than her previous efforts. "I feel like this album is self-destruction, then self-reflection and then sort of self-redemption", she said. "I really want people to hear my side of the story this time." 

The album opens with "Strangers by Nature", a cinematic tune featuring organs, strings and mournful lyrics. The song closes with the line "All right then, I'm ready", before leading into "Easy on Me", the album's lead single. The track is the second on the album and is a traditional piano ballad about healing from a divorce. "My Little Love" is a track dedicated to Adele's son, Angelo, with voice notes included in the song, speaking about her divorce and the pain of heartbreak. The album's fourth track, "Cry Your Heart Out" is an uptempo piano driven song, contrasting with its lyrics describing depression and anxiety, but also the feeling of relief. "Oh My God" features instrumentation from claps, keys, organ, and "rumbling" bass and combines R&B groove and a dance-pop–electropop sample, themed on Adele's first flirt after her divorce. "Can I Get It" is an acoustic guitar jam, with an upbeat whistled chorus. Lyrically, the song is about the feeling of love, and wanting a true, long-lasting relationship. "I Drink Wine" is a gospel-oriented power ballad, addressing Adele's divorce and shedding her ego before regaining the ability to love again.

"All Night Parking" is an interlude that features jazz pianist Erroll Garner, marking the first feature on a studio album by Adele. The song centers around the musical base of Joey Pecoraro's "Finding Parking" (2017), which samples Garner's "No More Shadows" (1964). The song is about falling in love in a long-distance relationship and the excitement that comes with it, even if it won't last. The song is only two minutes and forty-one seconds in length, making it the shortest track on the album. "Woman like Me" is the album's ninth track, built on an acoustic instrumental. The song is about a lover not willing to move on from his previous relationship, and letting his past cloud his current relationship, with Adele calling her lover out on his laziness and self-doubt. "Hold On" is a gospel-tinged song with Adele being backed by a choir. The song describes Adele's feelings about her divorce and telling herself to stay hopeful for the future. "To Be Loved" is another piano ballad, with lyrics a future version of Adele's son, explaining her divorce and finding the path to happiness again. The album's closer, "Love Is a Game", is a cinematic jazz influenced cut that lyrically details finding love again and navigating the ways of love.

Release

On 18 October 2020, Adele confirmed she would be hosting the 24 October episode of Saturday Night Live, reinvigorating fans' hope that new music would be imminent. However, during the episode, Adele confirmed that her fourth studio album was not yet finished. She later hinted via an Instagram post that she would be returning to music in 2021. Comedian Alan Carr, a close friend of Adele's, also hinted that the album would be released in 2021, describing the material he had heard from the album as "amazing" during an interview with Grazias UK edition.

Unlike 25, Adele confirmed that 30 would be available on streaming services the day of its release, in addition to a traditional release on physical formats. Likewise, 30 differed from Adele's previous releases in that it would not be released by XL Recordings; instead, its worldwide distribution was handled by Columbia Records, which previously only handled Adele's releases in North America. On 13 October 2021, Adele officially announced the title of the album would be 30 and that it was slated for release on 19 November 2021.

On 4 November, two weeks prior to the album release, Consequence reported "a major delay" in the vinyl record industry caused due in part to 30. Variety stated that Adele had to turn her album in six months beforehand in order to have its vinyl LPs ready for 19 November, the day it releases. More than 500,000 vinyl LPs of 30 were manufactured in the months leading up to the release day, with Sony Music removing catalogue albums from its overseas pressing plants to ensure "there won't be any shortage of Adele LPs going into the holidays", which coupled with the pre-existing delay in production due to the COVID-19 pandemic, became detrimental to albums by other artists. Ed Sheeran stated "there's like three vinyl factories in the world, so you have to do it like really upfront – and Adele had basically booked out all the vinyl factories, so we had to get a slot and get our album in there. It was like me, Coldplay, Adele, Taylor, ABBA, Elton, all of us were trying to get our vinyls printed at the same time."

Marketing and promotion
On the weekend of 1 October, a series of advertising hoardings and projections displaying the number "30" appeared in various locations across the globe, with reports that it could be tied to Adele's forthcoming studio album, 30. On Monday, 4 October, Adele's social media accounts and website were updated to match the blue colour from the advertisements, indicating an imminent announcement from Adele. The next day, Adele officially announced a 15 October release for the album's lead single, "Easy On Me", with a clip of its music video on her social media accounts. Later that week, Adele became the first person to simultaneously appear on the covers of both British and American Vogue publications in the same month; both magazines featured interviews in which Adele revealed details about her new album. The track-listing of 30 was revealed on 1 November 2021. A preview of "Hold On" was featured in an Amazon television commercial entitled Kindness, the Greatest Gift, portraying anxiety among young adults associated with the pandemic and premiered on 8 November 2021.

A handful of deluxe physical editions of 30 were made available for purchase through select retailers. The Target-exclusive deluxe edition adds two bonus tracks and a duet version of "Easy on Me" with American singer-songwriter Chris Stapleton. White-colored vinyl LPs were sold via Amazon, while transparent LPs were sold by Walmart. Cassette tapes of 30 were exclusively sold on Adele's webstore, as part of box sets. A HMV-exclusive edition of 30, with an alternate sleeve, was also sold. Music executives and journalists projected 30 to sell over a million albums in its opening week in the US.

Concerts 
For the US, Adele announced a television special, Adele One Night Only, would air on CBS on 14 November 2021. The special featured an exclusive interview with Oprah Winfrey, as well as live performances of both Adele's biggest hits and her newest songs from the album. The concert special drew 11.7 million viewers.

For the UK, another concert special called An Audience with Adele aired on 21 November via the free-to-air channel ITV, and was released to its on-demand platform ITV Hub; the one-off concert was captured at the London Palladium in London, and with an audience consisting of both fans and Adele's "own personal heroes and heroines, fellow musicians, artists, actors, sportsmen, sportswomen and more."

Weekends with Adele, a Las Vegas concert residency at the Colosseum at Caesars Palace, was announced for 21 January16 April 2022, running for 24 concerts (two per weekend). Its ticket prices ranged from US$85 to $600 for the balcony, and from $860 to $5,000 for the floor seats. On 20 January, a day before the first concert, Adele announced the postponement of the entire residency, saying "I'm so sorry, but my show ain't ready. Half my team have COVID and it's been impossible to finish the show." She also cited "delivery delays" as a reason, and apologized to the fans, many of whom supported her stance while the rest criticized her "last minute" decision costing "flight and hotel bookings".  On 25 July, Adele announced the rescheduled dates for the residency, including eight additional concerts, which started on 18 November 2022 and is set to run to 25 March 2023.

Adele also performed two concerts at British Summer Time Hyde Park, London, on 1 and 2 July 2022. Registration was possible on Adele's website at 8 am on 26 October 2021 to access the pre-sales. It was scheduled to start on 28 October, followed by a second session for American Express members on 29 October. Tickets were scheduled to go on general sale from 10:00 am on 30 October. However, on 28 October 2021, pre-sale tickets for these two concerts in London's Hyde Park sold out in less than an hour. 130,000 tickets were sold.

Singles 
The lead single, "Easy on Me", was released on 15 October 2021. The accompanying music video was directed by Canadian filmmaker Xavier Dolan in Sutton, a town in southwestern Quebec. Its music video was considered to be a sequel to the music video for 25s lead single, "Hello". Upon release, it broke multiple major records, including the most streamed song in a day and week on Spotify. The song topped the charts in 26 countries, including the UK Singles Chart and the US Billboard Hot 100. Featured in Target and Japanese editions of 30, the duet version with American singer Chris Stapleton was released to the US country radio format on 19 November 2021.

"Oh My God" was released as the second single on 29 November 2021, instead of "I Drink Wine" which was initially planned. It debuted at number two on the Official Singles Chart, being blocked from the top spot by her own "Easy on Me", and number five on the US Billboard Hot 100. The Sam Brown-directed music video promoting the song was uploaded onto Adele's official YouTube channel on 12 January 2022.

"I Drink Wine" was sent to Italian radio airplay on 4 November 2022, as the album's third single. Its release was accompanied by a music video directed by Joe Talbot.

Critical reception 

30 received widespread acclaim from music critics, many of whom dubbed it as Adele's best album yet. On Metacritic, which assigns a normalised score out of 100 to ratings from publications, the album received a weighted mean score of 88 based on 23 reviews, indicating "universal acclaim". It is Adele's highest-rated album on the site.

Rolling Stone music journalist Rob Sheffield called 30 Adele's "toughest, most powerful album yet" with the best vocal performances of her career, and praised its "deft" production by her collaborators. Neil McCormick, in his review for The Daily Telegraph, hailed 30 as her strongest record yet, containing "powerhouse" songs with "intense" emotions and "bravura" performances. Emma Swann of DIY described the album as "raw and uncompromising", matching cinematic music with lyrics on "the pain, the self-flagellation, the hope, the acceptance."

Evening Standard David Smyth called 30 "a devastating comeback" filled with both uptempo songs and heavy ballads. Mikael Wood of Los Angeles Times opined the album examines "love's causes and consequences" using Adele's personal experiences, and highlighted her "soaring yet pulpy, gorgeous" vocals. The Independent critic Annabel Nugent found the subject matter candid, unfiltered and "unmediated", as well as containing some optimistic love songs, unlike her previous records whose sad themes "can be wearisome in excess." Kate Solomon, writing for i, said that 30 was a "reverent and messy, polished and painful" album from a "woman in turmoil, from raging wine-fuelled nights to quiet teary moments".

David Cobbald, reviewing for The Line of Best Fit, complimented the theatrical essence of 30 and the use of electronic instruments and synthesisers in its production, but dismissed songs such as "Oh My God" and "Can I Get It" as "questionable". Pitchfork critic Jillian Mapes called 30 an "incredibly moving album" and Adele's most ambitious work to-date due to its "nuanced" production, but ruled out "Can I Get It" as a non-essential, pop radio filler. Reviews by NME El Hunt and The Guardian Alexis Petridis were mixed. Hunt said 30 was Adele's most creative album, but with lyrics still in "safer territory"; Hunt appreciated the new sounds, but felt the compositions of "Hold On", "I Drink Wine" and "Can I Get It" were jarring. Petridis said the album is monotonous musically and lyrically to her previous albums, and "given their sales figures, you couldn't blame Adele for declining to even tinker with a formula that clearly ain't broke. But she does, and it makes for 30 highlights."

Year-end lists

Accolades 
Adele received four nominations at the Brit Awards 2022, winning three; British Album of the Year for 30, Song of the Year for "Easy on Me", and Artist of the Year. Adele also received four nominations at the iHeartRadio Music Awards, winning two for 30 with Best Comeback Album and Pop Album of the Year.30 resulted in a Grammy win at the 65th Annual Grammy Awards for "Easy on Me". The song won the award for Best Pop Solo Performance, furthering Adele's streak for the most wins in the category with four.

Commercial performance 
On 29 October 2021, three weeks before its release, 30 became the most pre-added album ever on Apple Music, surpassing Billie Eilish's Happier Than Ever (2021); it also achieved the largest number of pre-adds in a single day, and did so in the shortest timeframe. The International Federation of the Phonographic Industry reported that Adele was the world's second best-selling female artist of 2021, behind Taylor Swift. 30 was the best-selling album of 2021 worldwide, topping the Global Album All-Format Chart, Global Album Sales Chart, and the newly created Global Vinyl Album Chart; the album sold 862,000 vinyl copies within the year.

Europe
On 22 November 2021, the Official Charts Company reported that 30 logged 167,000 chart sales in the UK in the first half of its opening week, more than the rest of the chart's top 40 combined. Five days after release, the album achieved the biggest opening week of 2021 in the country. It is also the highest opening week for an album by a female artist since 25. The album debuted at number one on the Official Albums Chart with 261,000 copies sold, the largest opening week since Ed Sheeran's ÷ (2017). The same week on the Official Singles Chart, Adele placed "Easy on Me" at number one, "Oh My God" at number two, and "I Drink Wine" at number four. 30 spent a total of five consecutive weeks atop the Official Albums Chart, tying Olivia Rodrigo's Sour as the longest-running number one album of 2021 on the chart. Ranking as the top album of 2021 in the UK, 30 exceeded 600,000 units in total activity, with 502,000 coming from pure sales (448,000 physical, 53,000 downloads).

30 debuted at number one in Germany, and with "Easy on Me" being at number one on the German Top 100 Singles chart, Adele became the first female artist to occupy the number one slots on the single and album charts thrice there simultaneously. In Ireland, 30 debuted at number one, outselling the rest of the Top 10 combined. 30 debuted at number two in France upon its release with 45,487 copies sold, only behind Orelsan's Civilisation. It later reached the top spot in its fifth week and was certified double platinum in the country less than two months after its release. Debuting at number one in the Netherlands, 30 became the best-selling album of 2021 in the country. It marked Adele's sixth time doing so, and also made her the first artist to have the top-selling album in six different years there. 30 additionally topped the charts in Austria, Belgium, Denmark, Finland, Greece, Iceland, Lithuania, Norway, Scotland, Spain, Sweden, and Switzerland.

United States
In the United States, 30 became the top-selling album of 2021 with 500,000 copies and 575,000 album-equivalent units in its first three days. The next day, 30 surpassed Certified Lover Boy by Drake for 2021's biggest opening week, earning 660,000 album-equivalent units in the US. 560,000 of that sum was album sales.

The album debuted atop the Billboard 200 with 839,000 album-equivalent units, including 692,000 pure album sales. The album's tracks collected 185.39 million on-demand streams within its first week, marking the fourth-biggest streaming debut week for an album by a woman in 2021. 30 surpassed the sales of any album in its previous 11 months combined. It tallied the highest album sales week since Swift's Folklore (2020). 30 also outsold the other 50 best-selling albums that week combined, as well as the other top 10 best-selling albums that week combined and tripled. All of the 12 tracks from 30 charted on the Billboard Hot 100 following its release, with six of them in the top 40. Adele's sum of chart entries rose from 14 to 25, tying with Billie Eilish as the female artist with the third-most entries on the chart in 2021. 

30 remained at number one in its second week with 288,000 units earned, including 225,000 pure album sales and 81.33 million on-demand streams, scoring the biggest second-week sales of the year, and the largest second-week total for any album since Drake's Scorpion (2018) moved 335,000 units. Midway through its third week, 30 had sold over a million pure copies in the US, becoming the first 2021 album to reach the milestone. In its third chart-topping week, 30 gained 193,000 units, marking the largest third week for any album since Scorpion. It also became the first album to spend its first four weeks at number one since Morgan Wallen's Dangerous: The Double Album in early 2021, and the first by a woman since Folklore did so. The same week, 30 moved 41,000 vinyl LPs, becoming the best-selling vinyl album of 2021. Garnering 212,000 units in its fifth week, 30 achieved the highest fifth-week units for an album since 25, and became the first album of the 2020s to earn over 200,000 units in three separate weeks; Adele reached 39 total weeks atop the Billboard 200, tying Elton John as the British soloist with the most weeks at number one on the chart. The album fell to number two in its seventh week with 57,000 units. 30 was certified triple platinum by the RIAA for shipments of three million units in the US.

30 was 2021's year-end best-seller with 1.464 million copies—1.219 million physical copies and 245,000 digital downloads—the only album to sell a million copies. This marked Adele's fifth time with the year's best-selling album. 30 was the fourth-most consumed album of 2021 and second among women, with 1.936 million units moved. Additionally, Adele was the second best-selling artist of 2021 with 1.62 million albums sold. Billboard noted that 30 sales helped boost pure sales, especially CD sales, of 2021; 30 was the top selling digital album, CD and vinyl LP of 2021. Adele was 2021's second best-selling artist in digital and vinyl sales, and CD sales. On 14 July 2022, Luminate (formerly MRC Data) reported that 30 was the fourth of the top 10 best-selling albums in the US during the first half of 2022, with 203,000 sales in this period. 30 ranked at number two on the 2022 Billboard 200 Year-End chart, as well as number one on the 2022 Billboard Top Album Sales Year-End chart.

Other markets
30 debuted atop the Billboard Canadian Albums Chart with 70,000 units in its first week, marking Adele's third number one album there. For 2021, 30 was Canada's top-selling album across all formats—digital, CD and vinyl LP. In total, the album spent six nonconsecutive weeks at number one. The album topped Australia's ARIA Albums Chart, where it scored the highest first week sales for any album since Divide four years prior, while nine of its tracks charted on the ARIA Singles Chart that week. The album topped the charts for seven consecutive weeks in the country. It debuted at number one on New Zealand Albums Chart while reaching gold status in its first week of release for surpassing sales of 7,500. It remained at number one for seven consecutive weeks. In Japan, 30 debuted at number five on the Oricon Japanese Albums chart and number four on the Billboard Japanese Albums Chart, while reaching number sixty-eight on the Gaon Album Chart in South Korea.

Impact 
Upon the announcement of 30 and the release of the lead single "Easy on Me", James Hall of The Daily Telegraph wrote that "a new Adele album isn't just a release − it's a global cultural event". Media outlets and fans dubbed 30 as part of a 2021 music trend called "Sad Girl Autumn" or "Sad Girl Fall", which refers to the release of melancholic and introspective music by female artists during autumn. Time praised Adele for "remaining relevant while blatantly ignoring trends", called her "a master of turning life into art" who "comes off alternately as unreachable and relatable" and "responds winkingly to headlines in a way that creates more headlines". Spotify removed the "shuffle" button for its Premium users as Adele proposed and commented that "Our art tells a story and our stories should be listened to as we intended." ABC News called her proposal "an example of her power in the music industry". 30 was regarded as one of 2021's greatest pop culture moments. 

In 2021, CNN reported 30 contributed largely to rise of both vinyl sales and CD sales, and they were reported to be up for the first time in 17 years. According to MRC Data's 2021 US Year-End Report, CD sales grew 1.1% from the year 2020. 30 sold almost 900,000 copies in the United States alone in CD format in 8 weeks. The album accounted for 2.15% of all CD sales in the year 2021. The A.V. Club noted Adele's homage to Amy Winehouse and her influence on 30. "30 is arguably Adele's most soul-baring album, getting into the nitty gritty of divorce, self-love, and raising a child in a split home. As Winehouse did on Back To Black, here Adele also navigates the grief that comes with breaking the ties of love, washing herself in heartache. In its own way, 30 feels like a thank-you to Winehouse and the mark she made on music."  Mic called the album "a record for the millennials" who "bare the emotional scars of time just as she does". The Ringer compared the difference between Adele and other pop stars, saying that "Unlike many of her peers, Adele is not obliged to keep a master narrative going to sustain general interest in her career. She just… sings."

Track listing 

Notes

  "All Night Parking" is built around the musical base of "Finding Parking" (2017) by Joey Pecoraro, which in turn samples the song "No More Shadows" (1964) by Erroll Garner.

Personnel
Musicians
 Adele – vocals (all tracks), voice notes (3), tambourine (5), stomps (6), handclaps (6, 12)
 Ludwig Göransson – piano, bass, rhodes, mellotron, synth programming (1)
 David Campbell – strings (1, 3, 7, 10, 12–15)
 Serena Göransson – strings (1)
 Greg Kurstin – bass, piano (2–5, 7); kick drum (2), mellotron (3, 4, 7), steel guitar (3), handclaps (4, 5), guitar (4), hammond B3 organ (4, 5, 7), drum programming, keyboards (5); percussion (5, 7), orchestron, rhodes (7)
 Angelo Adkins – voice notes (3)
 Chris Dave – drums (3–5, 9), percussion (3, 9, 12), bongos, vibraslap (4)
 Max Martin – piano, programming, keyboards, background vocals (6)
 Shellback – drums, bass, guitar, percussion, programming, whistle, keyboards, stomps, handclaps (6)
 Joey Pecoraro – drums, additional piano, trumpet, violin (8)
 Erroll Garner – piano (8)
 Inflo – bass (9, 10, 12), guitar (9), electric guitar, drums, piano, organ, percussion (10, 12); wurlitzer, handclaps (12)
 Tobias Jesso Jr. – piano (11)
 Chris Stapleton - vocals (15)

Technical

 Randy Merrill – mastering
 Matt Scatchell – mixing (1–4, 7–12)
 Tom Elmhirst – mixing (1–4, 7–12)
 Şerban Ghenea – mixing (5, 6)
 John Hanes – mixing (5, 6)
 Riley Mackin – engineering (1)
 Steve Churchyard – engineering (1, 3, 7, 10, 12–15)
 Alex Pasco – engineering (2–5, 7)
 Greg Kurstin – engineering (2–5, 7, 14, 15), vocal engineering (8)
 Julian Burg – engineering (2–5, 7, 14, 15), vocal engineering (8)
 Lasse Mårtén – engineering (6)
 Michael Ilbert – engineering (6)
 Sam Holland – engineering (6)
 Inflo – engineering (9, 10, 12)
 Matt Dyson – engineering (9, 12)
 Todd Monfalcone – engineering (9)
 Tom Campbell – engineering (10)
 Ivan Wayman – engineering (11)
 Shawn Everett – engineering (11)
 Ryan Lytle – engineering (12), engineering assistance (9)
 Bryce Bordone – engineering assistance (5, 6)
 Brian Rajaratnam – engineering assistance (10)

Charts

Weekly charts

Year-end charts

Certifications and sales

Release history

See also 
 List of Billboard 200 number-one albums of 2021
 List of Billboard 200 number-one albums of 2022
 List of UK Albums Chart number ones of the 2020s
 List of UK Album Downloads Chart number ones of the 2020s
 List of number-one albums of 2021 (Australia)
 List of number-one albums of 2022 (Australia)
 List of number-one albums of 2021 (Canada)
 List of number-one albums of 2022 (Canada)
 List of number-one albums of 2021 (Ireland)
 List of number-one albums from the 2020s (New Zealand)
 List of number-one albums in Norway

Footnotes

References
  Text was copied from 30 at Adele Wiki, which is released under a Creative Commons Attribution-Share Alike 3.0 (Unported) (CC-BY-SA 3.0) license.

2021 albums
Adele albums
Albums impacted by the COVID-19 pandemic
Albums postponed due to the COVID-19 pandemic
Albums produced by Shawn Everett
Albums produced by Ludwig Göransson
Albums produced by Greg Kurstin
Albums produced by Max Martin
Albums produced by Shellback (record producer)
Brit Award for British Album of the Year
Columbia Records albums
Albums produced by Inflo
Jazz albums by English artists
Albums produced by Tobias Jesso Jr.